Jolly LLB is a series of Indian Hindi-language courtroom black comedy drama films, written and directed by Subhash Kapoor and produced by Fox Star Studios.

Overview

Jolly LLB (2013)

The film begins with a drunk Rahul Dewan (Rajeev Siddhartha), racing in a Toyota Land Cruiser Prado against a Mercedes on 20 April 2009, after he is seduced by a woman in the passenger seat. He loses control and crashes into a wall on the footpath by the road. The film cuts to a court scene where Jagdish Tyagi a.k.a. Jolly (Arshad Warsi), an LLB (law-degree) graduate defending a surgeon against a Public interest litigation (PIL) filed against him after the surgeon had his son operate upon a patient in his pursuit of Guinness Book of World Records. Jolly loses the case but decides to move to the capital Delhi to try his luck. He happens to see prominent criminal lawyer Tejinder Rajpal (Boman Irani) defending Rahul Dewan in a sessions court. Rahul Dewan is accused of causing death under the influence of alcohol. Rajpal convinces the judge that prosecution had no evidence to implicate Rahul Dewan and he was being deliberately targeted by the media as he was from a rich family, resulting in Dewan's acquittal.

Rajpal, though, is not satisfied with the fee paid by the Dewans. Jolly, desperate to have some money and fame, decides to pursue the case and files a PIL in the court against Rahul Dewan's acquittal. After initially reprimanding Jolly for his mistakes in filing the PIL and taking the press reports as an evidence, Justice Tripathi (Saurabh Shukla) gives a date for hearing and warns Jolly to collect some evidence before the hearing. He then runs into Albert Pinto (Harsh Chhaya), who claims to have witnessed the accident. Then Jolly introduces him as a witness in the court and Judge Tripathi, after cross-examining him, gives a date for the next hearing. He also summons Rahul Dewan to be present in the court for the hearing. Jolly becomes a celebrity overnight and is admired by Kaul who donates a room in his restaurant to Jolly for using it as his office. However, Jolly's plans turn upside down, when Albert Pinto reveals to him that he is no witness, but a crony of Rajpal and it was part of a plan to extract more money from Dewan clan. As part of the deal, Pinto gives Jolly his share of the money paid by Dewans to silence Pinto. Jolly gleefully accepts the money and regrets that had he known this plan earlier, he would have demanded more money. Albert Pinto turns hostile in the court and Jolly accepts the statement given by Pinto. Judge Tripathi postpones the judgement for the next hearing. Sandhya, cousin and fiancée of Jolly, chides him for compromising on justice for his greed. Jolly realises his mistake once Kaul saab slaps him for his treachery. He returns the money to Rajpal and challenges him to win the case.

With the help of his brother-in-law Pratap (Manoj Pahwa), he collects the video footage of the Land Cruiser involved in the accident and presents it to the court. Though Rajpal counters him that the Land Cruiser was driven by the driver of Dewan family, Jolly refutes his statement by submitting the necessary evidence. Judge Tripathi orders the Police to provide a bodyguard for Jolly after he was manhandled by alleged assistants of Rajpal. Jolly learns that a survivor of the accident stays in Gorakhpur and decides to leave for Gorakhpur. SI Rathi tries to sabotage Jolly's investigation, but is rescued by his bodyguard. He identifies one Sadakanth Mishra as the survivor in Gorakhpur and brings him to Delhi. Jolly prosecutes SI Rathi and finds that he has botched up the investigation by declaring Sadakanth Mishra as dead and snatching his hard-earned money to stop him from killing Mishra. Mishra also identifies Rahul Dewan as the one who drove the Land Cruiser. After conclusion of arguments and counter-arguments between Rajpal and Jolly, Judge Tripathi directs Delhi Police to suspend SI Rathi and initiate a criminal inquiry against him and also declares Rahul Dewan as guilty of the crime and sentences him to seven years in jail under Section 304 of the Indian Penal Code. The film ends with Jolly celebrating with his team while Rajpal is crestfallen as he suffers defeat after a long time.

Jolly LLB 2 (2017)

It is the year 2016, Jagdishwar Mishra a.k.a. Jolly (Akshay Kumar) is a Lucknow based lawyer who works as an assistant (Munshi) to one of the most famous lawyers of Lucknow, Rizvi Sahab. He hails from Kanpur. To arrange money for his own chamber, Jolly lies to a pregnant lady, Hina (Sayani Gupta) and convinces her to give him rupees 200,000 as fees so that Rizvi Sahab would fight her case. Jolly uses that money to pay the final payment for his own chamber and opens it with a ceremony. When Hina finds out that she has been bluffed by Jolly, she commits suicide. Everyone blames Jolly for her death, including Jolly's father, who worked for 30 years as a clerk for Rizvi Sahab. Filled with guilt, Jolly along with his wife Pushpa (Huma Qureshi) & fellow lawyer Birbal (Rajiv Gupta), decides to fight Hina's case & files a PIL. He soon discovers that Hina's husband Iqbal Qasim (Manav Kaul) was killed in a fake encounter by Inspector Suryaveer Singh (Kumud Mishra) on 13 August 2015–the very next day of their marriage to get a promotion. Singh also shot a fellow constable, Bhadouriya, in his thigh, to show the encounter genuine. Bhadouriya later died due to excessive bleeding, Inspector Suryaveer Singh then hires the best lawyer in Lucknow Pramod Mathur (Annu Kapoor), his friend, to fight his case.

On the very first date, Jolly requests the court for an impartial enquiry into the encounter once again. However court gets adjourned. Jolly is able to get FIR copy &  papers regarding the case with the help of a bookie Guru Ji (Sanjay Mishra) in Varanasi by paying him Rs. 500,000. Later he is able to track Ram Kumar Bhadouriya, the son of the constable who died in the fake encounter
However, during the court hearing, under a heated argument, Jolly slaps advocate Mathur. Court orders a narco test of Ram Kumar.

Jolly is attacked by two henchmen send by Inspector Singh, but survives with two bullet wounds. However, Singh is suspended from Police Department. Advocate Mathur, uses his power and money to tamper with the narco test video of the witness and proves Jolly wrong in the court. Judge orders the temporary suspension of Jolly's license as a lawyer, but later, Chairman of Discipline Committee, Rizvi Sahab gives Jolly, 4 days of time to prove himself correct. Jolly soon notices that a Kashmir police constable visited Lucknow to identify the terrorist during Iqbal and Hina's wedding. Jolly travels to Kashmir and meets the constable, Fahim Butt, who is now suspended and arrested in a fake case. The constable reveals that the person who died in the encounter was not the real terrorist and is ready to give the statement in the court. Jolly manages to bring the constable to Lucknow court in the next hearing to prove that Iqbal Qasim was not the real terrorist. Meanwhile, Jolly also convinces the police commissioner to tell the truth or else, he will file PIL against all the encounters done by him. Advocate Mathur, tries his best to avoid constable from giving statement in the court as he creates tussle in the courtroom by insulting the judge. The court hearing proceeds till midnight, but Judge still decides to carry on. After constable's statement Jolly surprises everyone by bringing a Hindu Brahmin Pandit in the court (with the help of police commissioner), & claims that he is the real terrorist and has been arrested by the police in Mathura. Jolly cross questions the pandit in the court by asking him deep details of Hindu Vedas. The pandit finally breaks up and admits that he is the terrorist, Mohammad Iqbal Quadri, for whom police were searching and he had bribed Inspector Singh to set him free, hence police had encountered Iqbal Qasim to close the case. Judge then declares Iqbal Qasim innocent and orders the arrest of the terrorist, bails Ram Kumar, son of the constable and gives life imprisonment to Suryaveer Singh along with his accomplices for charge of murder, erasing evidence, misguiding court and showing fake evidences and thus Jolly wins the case. Film ends with Jolly walking out of the court along with his family & everybody praising him.

Jolly LLB vs Jolly LLB 2
After the successful second installment, the makers have confirmed to make a third part of this franchise. In November 2017, it is said that the third part will star both Akshay Kumar and Arshad Warsi with new Jolly LLB will star Shah Rukh Khan. The film will show the war between both the Jolly's. Saurabh Shukla, Sanjay Mishra and Brijendra Kala will reprise their respective roles in the film.

Cast and characters

Crew

Release and revenue

Awards

Jolly LLB

Jolly LLB 2

Remake
 2013 film Jolly LLB has been remade into Tamil film Manithan in 2016. In 2017 remade in Telugu as Sapthagiri LLB (2017).

See also
 Manithan''

References

External links
 
 

 
 

Indian film series
Indian courtroom films
Indian legal films
Indian sequel films
Indian comedy-drama films
2010s Hindi-language films
Indian black comedy films
Indian satirical films
Fox Star Studios films